Alex Adams (October 21, 1934 – July 22, 2011) was a college basketball head coach.  He coached the Akron Zips men's basketball team in 1975–76 to a 10–14 record. Adams was the first African-American to both play and coach basketball at the University of Akron.

References

1934 births
2011 deaths
African-American basketball coaches
African-American basketball players
Akron Zips men's basketball coaches
Akron Zips men's basketball players
Basketball players from Akron, Ohio
Sportspeople from Ocala, Florida
American men's basketball players
Basketball coaches from Ohio
20th-century African-American sportspeople
21st-century African-American people